Tochigi 3rd district (栃木[県第]3区 Tochigi[-ken dai-]san-ku) is a single-member electoral district for the House of Representatives, the lower house of the National Diet of Japan. Located in north-eastern Tochigi, it covers the cities of Ōtawara, Yaita, Nasushiobara, Nasukarasuyama and the towns of Nasu and Nakagawa in Nasu District. As of September 2011, 247,284 eligible voters were registered in Tochigi 3rd district, giving it well above average (347,878 voters per district) vote weight.

From the creation of the district until 2014, the representative from Tochigi 3rd district was former Liberal Democrat Yoshimi Watanabe who founded Your Party (Minna no Tō, lit. "Everyone's Party") in 2009. In that year, the established parties did not even contest the seat. The only challenger the Democratic Party ever nominated has been Takashi Kobayashi in 2005. In the first three elections, only the left-wing parties contested the seat. In 2014 Watanabe was involved in a scandal over undisclosed loans and lost the next elections to the LDP candidate Kazuo Yana.

Before the electoral reform, the area had been part of the five-member 1st district. Representatives from the 1st district had included Watanabe's father Michio who died in 1995.

List of representatives

Election results

References 

Tochigi Prefecture
Districts of the House of Representatives (Japan)